Church of All Saints is a  Grade I listed church in Cople, Bedfordshire, England. It became a listed building on 13 July 1964. The church, dedicated to All Saints, is constructed of sandstone and Dunstable clunch, in the Early English Period and Perpendicular styles.  It contains a chancel with side chapels, nave with clerestory, aisles, south porch and a tower containing 5 bells.  On the north side of the chancel, there is a marble altar tomb.  The nave and chancel have been restored since 1877. The register dates from the year 1560. Its patron was Christ Church, Oxford.

See also
Grade I listed buildings in Bedfordshire

References
 This article includes text incorporated from E.R. Kelly's "Kelly's directory of Bedfordshire, Hunts and Northamptonshire." (1885), a publication now in the public domain.

External links
 Official website

Church of England church buildings in Bedfordshire
Christ Church, Oxford
Grade I listed churches in Bedfordshire
All Saints